Blenniella interrupta, the dashed-line blenny, is a species of combtooth blenny found in coral reefs in the western Pacific ocean.

References

interrupta
Fish described in 1857